Constant Friendship is an unincorporated community in Harford County, Maryland, United States.

History
Constant Friendship took the name of the 18th-century farm of Thomas White, father of bishop William White.

Since the 1980s, Constant Friendship and the surrounding area has experienced large-scale commercial and residential development.

References

Unincorporated communities in Harford County, Maryland
Unincorporated communities in Maryland